James Turnbull is an Australian free software and open source author, security specialist, and software developer. He lives in Brooklyn, New York where he is VP of Engineering at Sotheby's and an advisor at Access Now. Prior to that he was co-chair of the Velocity conference, led startup advocacy at Microsoft, was founder and CTO at Empatico, CTO at Kickstarter, VP of Engineering at Venmo and VP of Service at Docker. He was also VP of Technology Operations for the open-source company Puppet Labs.

Career
Turnbull has been involved in technology and the open-source community since the early 1990s.  He has written eleven books on engineering, operations,  security and open-source software:

 Monitoring with Prometheus
 The Packer Book
 The Terraform Book
 The Art of Monitoring
 The Docker Book
 The Logstash Book
 Pro Puppet (Apress 2011)
 Pro Linux System Administration (Apress 2009)
 Pulling Strings with Puppet (Apress 2008)
 Pro Nagios 2.0 (Apress 2006)
 Hardening Linux (Apress 2004)

He has also published numerous articles on Linux and open source technology.

Free Software involvement
Turnbull is a contributor to Docker, the open source logging tool Logstash, Riemann, Prometheus, the qpsmtpd SMTP daemon, and the Puppet configuration management tool.

Turnbull was the Treasurer, member of the papers committee, and coordinated the mini-conference program at linux.conf.au 2008.

He is a member of Linux Australia, including being President in 2010 and sitting on the Executive Council in 2008. He has previously also been on the committee of Linux Users of Victoria.

References

External links
 Blog
 Homepage
 Riemann

Living people
Free software programmers
Australian computer specialists
Year of birth missing (living people)
Writers from Brooklyn